Nelson is a silent 1926 British historical film directed by Walter Summers and starring Cedric Hardwicke, Gertrude McCoy and Frank Perfitt. A biopic of Admiral Horatio Nelson, it is based on the biography by Robert Southey. It was made with the approval of the Admiralty.

The film's sets were designed by the art director Walter Murton.

Partial cast
 Cedric Hardwicke as Horatio Nelson 
 Gertrude McCoy as Lady Hamilton 
 Frank Perfitt as Captain Hardy 
 Frank Arlton as Governor 
 Pat Courtney as Nelson as a child

References

External links

Nelson at British Pathé

1926 films
1920s historical films
British black-and-white films
British historical films
1920s English-language films
Films directed by Walter Summers
Films set in the 1800s
Films based on biographies
Napoleonic Wars naval films
British silent feature films
1920s British films
Silent adventure films